West Mani ( - Dytiki Mani) is a municipality in the Messenia regional unit, Peloponnese, Greece. The seat of the municipality is the town Kardamyli. The municipality has an area of 402.809 km2. It comprises the northwestern part of the Mani region. The southeastern part of Mani is covered by the municipality East Mani, in Laconia.

Municipality
The municipality West Mani was formed at the 2011 local government reform by the merger of the following 2 former municipalities, that became municipal units:
Avia
Lefktro

References

Municipalities of Peloponnese (region)
Populated places in Messenia
Mani Peninsula